"Pretty Little Adriana" is a song written and recorded by American country music artist Vince Gill.  It was released in October 1996 as the third single from the album High Lonesome Sound.  The song reached number 2 on the Billboard Hot Country Singles & Tracks chart and won Gill a Grammy Award for Best Male Country Vocal Performance.

Content
The song is about the death of a child as seen from the parents' perspective. Gill was inspired to write the song after reading a news story about a 12-year-old girl named Adriane Dickerson who was shot to death outside a Nashville supermarket in 1995.

Critical reception
Deborah Evans Price, of Billboard magazine gave the song a mixed review, calling it "a little lackluster" and saying that not every song can be an "I Still Believe in You" or a "Go Rest High on That Mountain." However, she goes on to say that the song boasts "tasty guitar work, a pretty melody, and, of course, Gill's signature vocals."

Chart performance
"Pretty Little Adriana" debuted at number 63 on the U.S. Billboard Hot Country Singles & Tracks for the week of November 9, 1996.

Year-end charts

References

1997 singles
1996 songs
Vince Gill songs
Songs written by Vince Gill
Song recordings produced by Tony Brown (record producer)
MCA Nashville Records singles
Grammy Award for Best Male Country Vocal Performance winners